Tegula picta is a species of sea snail, a marine gastropod mollusk in the family Tegulidae.

Description
The shells of most species of sea snails are spirally coiled. The height of the shell is 18.5 mm, its diameter 20.2 mm.

Distribution
This species occurs in the Pacific Ocean from Ecuador to Peru.

References

  McLean J. (1970, "1969").  New species of tropical eastern Pacific Gastropoda. Malacological Review, 2(2): 115-130

External links
 To USNM Invertebrate Zoology Mollusca Collection
 To World Register of Marine Species
 

picta
Gastropods described in 1970